Breakfast in Bed is a 1963 German comedy film directed by Axel von Ambesser and starring O.W. Fischer, Liselotte Pulver and Ann Smyrner. The wife of a newspaper editor grows sick of his frequent absences.

It was shot at the Spandau Studios and on location in Berlin. The film's sets were designed by the art director Hans Jürgen Kiebach and Ernst Schomer.

Cast
 O.W. Fischer as Henry Clausen
 Liselotte Pulver as Liane Clausen
 Lex Barker as Victor H. Armstrong
 Ann Smyrner as Claudia Westorp
 Ruth Stephan as Cilly
 Edith Hancke as Mrs. Müller
 Loni Heuser as Melanie

References

Bibliography

External links

1963 films
1963 romantic comedy films
German romantic comedy films
West German films
1960s German-language films
Films directed by Axel von Ambesser
Films about journalists
Adultery in films
Films shot in Berlin
Films shot at Spandau Studios
1960s German films